Storsjo, Storsjoe, or Storsjoen can mean:

Places 
Storsjøen (Odal), lake in the Odal valley in Innlandet county, Norway
Storsjøen (Rendalen), a lake in Rendalen municipality in Innlandet county, Norway
Storsjøen (Tolga), a lake in Tolga municipality in Innlandet county, Norway
Storsjön, lake in Jämtland, Sweden
Storsjöodjuret, legendary monster in Storsjön